Sinhala Archaic Numbers is a Unicode block containing Sinhala Illakkam number characters.

History
The following Unicode-related documents record the purpose and process of defining specific characters in the Sinhala Archaic Numbers block:

References 

Unicode blocks
Sinhala language